Gwynne Williams (born 1937) is a Welsh writer of poetry and prose as well as a translator of numerous literary works from English into Welsh.

A strong proponent of Cymraeg, the native language of Wales, Williams has been writing since the 1950s, with several volumes in print, including Rhwng gewyn ac asgwrn (1969), Gwreichion (three editions between 1973 and 1991) and Pysg (two editions in English and Welsh, 1986). Starting in 1970, he has also translated the works of Jez Alborough, Jan Fearnley, Judy Hindley, Mick Inkpen, Colin McNaughton, Alison Ritchie, Roald Dahl and others, specialising particularly in children's books, with over 35 titles in print. He also has a regular presence at Welsh-language literary events and on BBC's Cardiff-based division, BBC Cymru Wales.

References

See also
List of Welsh language authors

Welsh-language writers
Welsh poets
Welsh children's writers
Welsh translators
English–Welsh translators
1937 births
Date of birth missing (living people)
Place of birth missing (living people)
Living people